Nasza TV was a Polish supraregional television network, started operating on January 17, 1998, initially with 10 broadcasting stations in Poland, owned by Polskie Media S.A..

In the terrestrial broadcasting and cable networks, it initially reached 47% of households. Thanks to the close cooperation with the satellite channel RTL 7, some programs were retransmitted here and were also available as a result throughout the country. On June 3, 1999, the TV signal appeared on the digital TV platform Wizja TV, on the network of PTK and later on Cyfrowy Polsat. Besides that, the station was launched via another terrestrial transmitters like TV Odra. On March 31, 2000, after the acquisition of Polskie Media S.A. by Polsat, the channel was replaced by TV4.

References

External links

Defunct television channels in Poland
Television channels and stations established in 1998
Television channels and stations disestablished in 2000
1998 establishments in Poland
2000 disestablishments in Poland
Polish-language television stations
Mass media in Warsaw